Henry Kenneth "Duke" Sedgwick (June 1, 1898 – December 4, 1982) was a pitcher in Major League Baseball. He played for the Philadelphia Phillies and Washington Senators in the 1920s.

Sedgwick signed with the Phillies in July 1921 after being discovered playing amateur baseball in Washington, DC.

References

External links

1898 births
1982 deaths
Major League Baseball pitchers
Philadelphia Phillies players
Washington Senators (1901–1960) players
Augusta Tygers players
Asheville Tourists players
Frederick Hustlers players
Bridgeport Bears (baseball) players
Portland Mariners players
Baseball players from Ohio
People from Martins Ferry, Ohio
Nashville Vols players